Russian Journal of Physical Chemistry A: Focus on Chemistry (Russian: Zhurnal Fizicheskoi Khimii)  is an English-language translation of the Russian-language peer-reviewed scientific journal published by Pleiades Publishing, Ltd and Springer Science+Business Media. The journal focuses on review articles pertaining to global coverage of all theory and experiment in physical chemistry, disseminated by the Russian Academy of Sciences, as well as other Russian academic and research centers. The editor-in-chief is Aslan Yu Tsivadze. This journal was founded in 1930.

Abstracting and indexing
 Current Contents/Physical, Chemical and Earth Sciences
 Reaction Citation Index
 Science Citation Index Expanded 
 Journal Citation Reports/Science Edition
 Scopus 
 Inspec 
 Astrophysics Data System
 Chemical Abstracts Service 
 CSA Illumina 
 EI-Compendex
 INIS Atomindex 
 International Bibliography of Book Reviews (IBR), 
 International Bibliography of Periodical Literature (IBZ)
 Reaxys

See also
 Russian Journal of Physical Chemistry B
 Annual Review of Physical Chemistry
 Journal of Chemical Physics
 The Journal of Physical Chemistry A
 The Journal of Physical Chemistry B
 The Journal of Physical Chemistry C
 The Journal of Physical Chemistry Letters
 Chemical physics
 Physical chemistry

References

External links

Nauka academic journals
Springer Science+Business Media academic journals
Physical chemistry journals
Publications established in 1930
English-language journals
Russian-language journals
Russian Academy of Sciences academic journals